Till Winfried Bärnighausen (born 1969) is an Alexander von Humboldt University Professor and Director of the Heidelberg Institute of Global Health at the Faculty of Medicine, University of Heidelberg, Germany. He is also Adjunct Professor of Global Health at the Department of Global Health and Population, Harvard T.H. Chan School of Public Health, a Faculty Member at the Harvard Center for Population and Development Studies, and a Senior Faculty at the Wellcome Trust's Africa Health Research Institute in South Africa.

Biography 
Until 1997, Bärnighausen studied medicine at the Ruprecht-Karls-Universität Heidelberg. In 1998, he finished his doctoral degree (in the field of medical history focusing on experiments on human beings by the Japanese military in China during the second world war). His higher specialist training focused on internal medicine (Zulassung 2002). In 2001, he finished his master's degree in Health System Management at the London School of Hygiene and Tropical Medicine and in 2006 he finished his master's degree in Master-Abschluss in Economics and Finance at the London University. From 2004 onwards, he became associate professor at the Africa Health Research Institute (AHRI) of the Wellcome Trust at the University of KwaZulu-Natal in South Africa. In 2008, he finished acquired the Doctor of Science (Sc.D. in Population and International Health) at T.H. Chan School of Public Health, where he was appointed professor in 2009. In 2016, he moved back to Heidelberg University where he received an Alexander von Humboldt-professorship leading the Heidelberg Institute of Global Health (HIGH).

Bärnighausen's research focuses on establishing the causal impact of global health interventions on population health, social, and economic outcomes. In particular, he works on large-scale population health interventions for HIV, diabetes , hypertension, and vaccine-preventable diseases. His research has been funded by the Alexander von Humboldt Foundation, the Wellcome Trust, NIH (including 6 R01 grants), the European Union, ANRS, International Initiative for Impact Evaluation (3ie), the Clinton Health Access Initiative (CHAI), the Elton John AIDS Foundation, the Rush Foundation, USAID, UNAIDS, World Bank, and GAVI. In 2016, Till Bärnighausen received the Alexander von Humboldt Professor Award, Germany's most highly endowed international science price.

References

External links
 Till Bärnighausen Profile at Heidelberg University, Heidelberg Institute of Global Health
 Humboldt Professor Till Bärnighausen, Heidelberg University, 17 May 2017
 Webseite Harvard T.H. Chan of Public Health, Department of Global Health and Population

1969 births
Living people
Heidelberg University alumni
Academic staff of Heidelberg University
20th-century German physicians
21st-century German physicians
Alumni of the London School of Hygiene & Tropical Medicine
Harvard Medical School alumni
Harvard Medical School faculty
Academic staff of the University of KwaZulu-Natal
German expatriates in South Africa
German expatriates in the United States
German expatriates in the United Kingdom